Aleksey Lozhkin (born 21 February 1974) is a Belarusian ice hockey player. He competed in the men's tournament at the 1998 Winter Olympics.

Career statistics

Regular season and playoffs

International

References

External links
 

1974 births
Living people
Soviet ice hockey left wingers
Olympic ice hockey players of Belarus
Ice hockey players at the 1998 Winter Olympics
Ice hockey people from Minsk
HC Dinamo Minsk players
Chicoutimi Saguenéens (QMJHL) players
Tallahassee Tiger Sharks players
Fredericton Canadiens players
Grand Rapids Griffins (IHL) players
Belarusian expatriate sportspeople in Canada
Belarusian expatriate sportspeople in the United States
Belarusian ice hockey left wingers
Belarusian expatriate sportspeople in Russia
Belarusian expatriate sportspeople in Finland
Belarusian expatriate sportspeople in England
Belarusian expatriate sportspeople in Denmark
Expatriate ice hockey players in the United States
Expatriate ice hockey players in Russia
Expatriate ice hockey players in Finland
Expatriate ice hockey players in England
Expatriate ice hockey players in Denmark
Expatriate ice hockey players in Canada
Belarusian expatriate ice hockey people